Lingshan or Ling-shan Temple may refer to:
 Lingshan Temple (Haikou), in Meilan District, Haikou, Hainan
 Lingshan Temple (Shantou), in Chaoyang District of Shantou, Guangdong, China
 Lingshan Temple (Xinyang), in Xinyang, Henan, China
 Lingshan Temple (Luoyang), in Luoyang, Henan, China
 Lingshan Temple (Qi County), in Qi County, Henan, China
 Lingshan Temple (Anyang), in Anyang, Henan, China
 Lingshan Temple (Mianning County), in Mianning County, Sichuan, China
 Lingshan Temple (Chaoyang County), in Chaoyang County, Liaoning, China
 Lingshan Temple (Huludao), in Huludao, Liaoning, China
 Lingshan Temple (Liupanshui), in Liupanshui, Guizhou, China
 Lingshan Temple (Guangde County), in Guangde County, Anhui, China
 Lingshan Temple (Tai'an), in Tai'an, Shandong, China
 Lingshan Temple (Lishui), in Lishui, Zhejiang, China
 Lingshan Temple (Kaihua County), in Kaihua County, Zhejiang, China
 Lingshan Temple (Liuqiu) on Liuqiu Island, off Taiwan